OpenDRIVE is an open format specification to describe a road network's logic. Its objective is to standardize the logical road description between different driving simulators.

The initial release of OpenDRIVE was version 0.7 in 2005, as of August 2021 the current release is version 1.7.0.

Overview
OpenDRIVE files describe road networks with respect to the data belonging to the road environment. They do not describe the entities acting on or interacting with the road. The OpenDRIVE data is made available to e.g. Vehicle Dynamics and Traffic Simulation via a layer of routines for the evaluation of the information contained in the OpenDRIVE file.

OpenDRIVE is managed by VIRES Simulationstechnologie GmbH and the OpenDRIVE community. The OpenDRIVE standard is reviewed and released by a team of driving simulation experts. With the publication in 2006 members of BMW Forschung und Technik GmbH, Daimler AG, DLR e.V., Fraunhofer-Institut IVI, Krauss-Maffei Wegmann GmbH & Co. KG, Rheinmetal Defence Electronics GmbH and VIRES Simulationstechnologie GmbH joined the initiative.

OpenCRG, the microscopic brother, is available taking care of the provision and evaluation of road surface descriptions. An implementation of OpenCRG into the OpenDRIVE file format specification has already been established in January 2008.

History

Founders 
OpenDRIVE was started in 2005 by Daimler Driving Simulator, Stuttgart and VIRES Simulationstechnologie GmbH. With the publication of the initiative in 2006, other companies joined OpenDRIVE. In September 2018 OpenDrive was transferred to ASAM 
and is now continued under the name of ASAM OpenDRIVE.

Core Team
The OpenDRIVE standard is reviewed and released by a core team of driving simulation experts. The team members as of January 2010 are (alphabetical order by company):
 Martin Strobl - BMW Forschung und Technik GmbH
 Hans Grezlikowski - Daimler AG, Germany
 Andreas Richter - Deutsches Zentrum für Luft- und Raumfahrt e.V., Germany
 Dr. Günther Nirschl - Fraunhofer-Institut IVI, Germany
 Ekkehard Klärner - Krauss-Maffei Wegmann GmbH & Co. KG, Germany
 Dr. Bernhard Bock - Rheinmetall Electronics GmbH, Germany
 Ingmar Stel - TNO, the Netherlands
 Marius Dupuis - VIRES Simulationstechnologie GmbH, Germany
 Mats Lidström - VTI, Sweden

Features
The OpenDRIVE file format provides the following features:
 XML format, hierarchical structure
 analytical definition of road geometry (plane elements, elevation, crossfall, lane width etc.)
 various types of lanes
 junctions incl. priorities
 logical inter-connection of lanes
 signs and signals incl. dependencies
 signal controllers (e.g. for junctions)
 road surface properties
 road and road-side objects
 user-definable data beads
etc.

Tools
Evaluation of the logics data can be simplified by using a library, which serves as the standard interface between the OpenDRIVE data contained in the XML files and the evaluation of the road data within the application. Tools for OpenDRIVE are available via the website of VIRES Simulationstechnologie GmbH or linked sites of partners include:

Real-Time Road Evaluation Library
 e.g. OpenDRIVE Real-Time Library

Road Designer
 e.g. Road Designer ROD

Traffic and Scenario Simulation
 e.g. OpenDRIVE Traffic and Scenario Simulation

Version History

See also

 RoadXML
 OpenCRG - the microscopic brother of OpenDRIVE

Notes

References

External links
 VIRES Simulationstechnologie GmbH
 OpenCRG.org
 OpenDRIVE.org
 DSC 2010 Europe
 DSC North America

Driving simulators
XML